The Rhodes-Livingstone Institute (RLI) was the first local anthropological research facility in Africa; it was founded in 1937 under the initial directorship of Godfrey Wilson. It is located a few miles outside Lusaka. Designed to allow for easier study of the local cultures of Northern Rhodesia, now Zambia, it became the base of operations for a number of leading anthropologists of the time.

The RLI anthropologists have been lauded by some as liberal, anti-racists, furthering the cause of African independence. Among the participating anthropologists at the RLI, In addition to Wilson, were Monica Hunter Wilson, Max Gluckman, J. Desmond Clark, Elizabeth Colson, E.L. Epstein, J. Clyde Mitchell, and William Watson.

Others have called attention to what they regard as misguidedness on the part of the RLI anthropologists, stemming from the fact that they were embedded in the colonial system and blind to its reality as a component in dialectic study. Contrasting views  are presented in a study by Lyn Schumaker (2001) and a chapter by Richard Brown (1973).

Publications
The Institute published a series of papers:
 No.  1 - 1938 - The land rights of individuals among the Nyakyusa by Godfrey Wilson
 No.  2 - 1938 - The study of African society by Godfrey Wilson and Monica Hunter Wilson
 No.  3 - 1939 - The Constitution of Ngonde by Godfrey Wilson
 No.  4 - 1939 -  ?? 
 No.  5 - 1941 - An Essay on the Economics of Detribalization in Northern Rhodesia - Part 1 by G.Wilson.
 No.  6 - 1942 - An Essay on the Economics of Detribalization in Northern Rhodesia - Part 2 by G.Wilson.
 No.  7 - 1941 - Economy of the Central Barotse Plain. By Max Gluckman.
 No.  8 - 1942 - Good out of Africa. By A. T. Culwick
 No.  9 - 1968 - The African as suckling and as adult. by J.F. Ritchie
 No. 10 - 1943 - Lozi Land Tenure
 No. 12 - 1946 - Fishermen of the Bangweulu Swamps
 No. 13 - 1948 - Rooiyard by Ellen Hellmann.
 No. 18 - ???? - Gusii Bridewealth: Law and Custom by Philip Mason
 No. 20 - 1951 - Marriage in a changing society by J.A. Barnes
 No. 21 - 1951 -  ? on the Luapula
 No. 22 - 1953 - Accommodating the spirit amongst some North-Eastern Shona tribes by J.F. Holleman
 No. 26 - 1956 - A Social Survey of the African Population of Livingstone.  by Merran McCulIoch.
 No. 30 - 1961 -  [unreadable] 

Also a series of Occasional Papers

References

Science and technology in Zambia
Educational institutions established in 1938
1938 establishments in Northern Rhodesia
Anthropological research institutes